"(Can You) Feel the Passion" is a 1991 rave-theme House song recorded, written, and produced by the American/British group Blue Pearl. The single is to date the act's second best known song after Naked In The Rain. Can You Feel The Passion had better success in the United States, hitting No. 1 on both Billboard's Hot Dance Club Play chart and the UK Dance Chart in 1992, while reaching No. 14 on the UK Singles Chart.

Background
The single is done in a spoken word type manner by lead singer Durga McBroom, while the hook, riffs, and chorus melody written by Durga was augmented by Youth on the keyboards, and samples from Bizarre Inc's "Playing with Knives." Ironically, club DJs have used both "(Can You) Feel the Passion" and "Playing With Knives" in their bootleg mashups due to the former providing the lyrics and the latter's piano-heavy house feel.

Track listing
 CD Maxi (US)
   "(Can You) Feel The Passion" (Youth Mix) (5:48) 
   "(Can You) Feel The Passion" (U.S. Mix)  (3:25) 
   "(Can You) Feel The Passion" (Adrenalin Mix) (5:35)
   "(Can You) Feel The Passion (House Mix)" (6:23)  
   "(Can You) Feel The Passion (Zen Mix)" (6:03)

See also 
 List of number-one dance singles of 1992 (U.S.)

References

External links
 Single release information at Discogs
 Music Video on YouTube

1991 songs
1991 singles
Songs written by Youth (musician)
Electronic songs
House music songs
Techno songs
Spoken word
SBK Records singles